Edwin Holroyd (27 October 1855 — 9 April 1914) was an English cricketer. He was a right-handed batsman and a right-arm medium-pace bowler who played for Lancashire. He was born in Halifax, Yorkshire and died in Rochdale, Lancashire.

Holroyd made a single first-class appearance, against Nottinghamshire in 1878. Batting in the middle order, he made just two runs in the first innings and four in the second.

Holroyd played three games over the following three seasons for Rochdale - twice playing against a team of touring Australians.

1855 births
1914 deaths
English cricketers
Lancashire cricketers
Cricketers from Halifax, West Yorkshire